The 1972 U.S. Professional Indoor – singles was an event of the  1971 U.S. Professional Indoor men's tennis tournament played at the Spectrum in Philadelphia, Pennsylvania in the United States from February 8 through February 13, 1971. The draw comprised 32 players and 8 of them were seeded. John Newcombe was the defending singles champion but lost in the second round. First-seeded Rod Laver won the title, defeating second-seeded Ken Rosewall in the final, 4–6, 6–2, 6–2, 6–2.

Seeds

  Rod Laver (champion)
  Ken Rosewall (final)
  Arthur Ashe (semifinals)
  Tom Okker (semifinals)
  John Newcombe (second round)
  Cliff Drysdale (quarterfinals)
  Marty Riessen (quarterfinals)
  Robert Lutz (quarterfinals)

Draw

Finals

Top half

Bottom half

External links
 Main draw

U.S. Pro Indoor
1972 Grand Prix (tennis)